PBX may refer to:

Pakubuwono X, the tenth Susuhunan of Surakarta in Java, Indonesia
Polymer-bonded explosive
Pre-B-cell leukemia homeobox
Private branch exchange, a telephone exchange that serves a particular business or office
PBX Funicular Intaglio Zone, a 2012 album by John Frusciante
PBX, a rewrite of the Project Builder IDE for Apple OS X systems
PhotoBox, a digital photo printing service